These are the official results of the Men's 100 metres event at the 1987 IAAF World Championships in Rome, Italy. There were a total number of 56 participating athletes, with seven qualifying heats and the final held on Sunday 30 August 1987.

Ben Johnson of Canada initially won the final in a world record time of 9.83 seconds, but he was disqualified by the IAAF on 30 September 1989 after he admitted to the use of performance-enhancing drugs between 1981 and 1988.

Medalists

Records
Existing records at the start of the event.

Final

Semifinals
Held on Sunday 1987-08-30

Quarterfinals
Held on Saturday 1987-08-29

Qualifying heats
Held on Saturday 1987-08-29

References
 Results

 
100 metres at the World Athletics Championships